The Tampa Bay Tornadoes are a professional indoor football team based in Lakeland, Florida, (and representing the larger region of Tampa Bay) the Tornadoes play their home games at the RP Funding Center.

The team joined American Arena League (AAL) for the 2020 season, but did not play due to the onset of the COVID-19 pandemic. The team was announced to have joined the National Arena League for the 2021 season; however, the team was terminated from the league after failing to provide letters of credit. Following the dismissal from the National Arena League, the team rejoined the AAL and began play in 2021 as a member of the East division, but did not finish the season. They then left the AAL for a newly formed league called the American Indoor Football Alliance for the 2022 season. The team succeeded the region's previous arena football team, the Tampa Bay Storm, that ceased operations in 2017.

History
Following the dissolvement of the Tampa Bay Storm in 2017, after playing for thirty years and being the only remaining charter member from the Arena Football League's inaugural season, the Tampa Bay Tornado advertised themselves as the successor to the former team. In 2019, the Tornadoes were an expansion team in the South Division of the American Arena League (AAL) for the 2020 season with Arena Football Hall of Famer and former Storm player Stevie Thomas serving as the team's first head coach and home games at Expo Hall in Tampa, Florida. The 2020 season was then cancelled due to the COVID-19 pandemic.

In July 2020, they were approved to join the National Arena League (NAL) for the 2021 season, where they were to play against former Tampa Bay Storm rivals, Jacksonville Sharks and a relaunched Orlando Predators. The team was terminated from the NAL after not providing letters of credit, although the Tornadoes had notified the league about their intentions to withdraw and rejoin the AAL. Shortly after, the team rejoined the AAL for the 2021 season, but were instead playing home games in Lakeland, Florida, at the RP Funding Center. The team did not finish the 2021 season and have since joined the American Indoor Football Alliance, along with other former AAL teams. The team appears to have been rebranded as the Tampa Bay Cyclones prior to the 2022 season.

Statistics and records

Season-by-season results

Head coach records
Note: Statistics are correct through week six of the 2021 AAL season.

2021 season

The 2021 Tampa Bay Tornadoes season was the team's inaugural season. Prior to the season, the Tornadoes were originally scheduled to play at the St. Louis Bandits (March 27), Georgia Cobras (April 3), at the Spokane Shock (May 8), and Northern Arizona Wranglers (August 8); however, these games were not played during the course of the season. The Tornadoes withdrew from the rest of the season near the end of May.

Schedule

References

External links
Tampa Bay Tornadoes official website

American football teams in Florida
American football teams in Tampa, Florida
American football teams established in 2019
Sports in Tampa, Florida
Sports teams in Tampa, Florida